Methanocaldococcus formerly known as Methanococcus is a genus  of coccoid methanogen archaea. They are all mesophiles, except the thermophilic M. thermolithotrophicus and the hyperthermophilic M. jannaschii. The latter was discovered at the base of a “white smoker” chimney at 21°N on the East Pacific Rise and it was the first archaean genome to be completely sequenced, revealing many novel and eukaryote-like elements.

Nomenclature

The name Methanocaldococcus has Latin and Greek roots, methano for methane, caldo for hot, and the Greek kokkos for the spherical shape of the cells.  Overall, the name means spherical cell that produces methane at hot temperatures.

Metabolism

All species in Methanocaldococcus are obligate methanogens.  They use hydrogen to reduce carbon dioxide. Unlike many other species within Euryarchaeota, they cannot use formate, acetate, methanol or methylamines as substrates.

Phylogeny
The currently accepted taxonomy is based on the List of Prokaryotic names with Standing in Nomenclature (LPSN)  and National Center for Biotechnology Information (NCBI).

See also
 List of Archaea genera
 Methanocaldococcus sp. FS406-22

References

Further reading

Scientific journals

Scientific books

Scientific databases

External links

Information on type species 'Methanocaldococcus jannaschii'
Methanocaldococcus at BacDive -  the Bacterial Diversity Metadatabase

Archaea genera
Euryarchaeota